Celaenorrhinus kimboza is a species of butterfly in the family Hesperiidae. It is found in Tanzania. The habitat consists of limestone forest vegetation, at the foot of the Uluguru Mountains.

References

Endemic fauna of Tanzania
Butterflies described in 1949
kimboza